Fred Blankemeijer (13 August 1926 – 8 November 2010) was a Dutch footballer who was active as a defender. A one-club man, he was member of Feijenoord for over 70 years.

Club career
A tall but skinny defender, Blankemeijer made his professional debut at Feijenoord, and played a total of 28 matches for the club between 1949 and 1953.

Retirement
After his career he would serve the club for many years in many occupations. He was a youth coach, a scout, a board member as well as a technical director. He was decorated Knight of the Order of Orange-Nassau in 2004. In June 2010 he served Feyenoord for a total of 70 years.

Widely regarded as a real club icon, he died of pneumonia, aged 84, on 8 November 2010.

See also
 List of one-club men

References

External links
 Fred Blankemeijer 1926-2010 – Feyenoord 

1926 births
2010 deaths
Footballers from Rotterdam
Association football defenders
Dutch footballers
Dutch businesspeople
Feyenoord players
Feyenoord non-playing staff
Knights of the Order of Orange-Nassau